Tijeras Peak is a high mountain summit in the Sangre de Cristo Range of the Rocky Mountains of North America. Tijeras Peak is the highest summit in Great Sand Dunes National Park and Preserve. Tijeras is Spanish for scissors, and refers to the double-pronged rocky tip of the mountain.

Mountain

Historical names
Tijeras Peak – 1970 
Tiseras Peak

See also

List of Colorado mountain ranges
List of Colorado mountain summits
List of Colorado fourteeners
List of Colorado 4000 meter prominent summits
List of the most prominent summits of Colorado
List of Colorado county high points

References

External links

summitpost.org

Mountains of Colorado
Mountains of Saguache County, Colorado
Great Sand Dunes National Park and Preserve
Highest points of United States national parks
Rio Grande National Forest
Sangre de Cristo Mountains
North American 4000 m summits